|}

The Ascot Hurdle is a Grade 2 National Hunt hurdle race in Great Britain which is open to horses aged four years or older. It is run at Ascot over a distance of about 2 miles and 3½ furlongs (2 miles, 3 furlongs and 58 yards, or 3,875 metres), and during its running there are ten hurdles to be jumped. The race is scheduled to take place each year in November. It is currently sponsored by Coral bookmakers and run as the Coral Hurdle.

Winners since 1978

See also
 Horse racing in Great Britain
 List of British National Hunt races

References
 Racing Post:

 pedigreequery.com – Ascot Hurdle – Ascot.

External links
 Race Recordings

National Hunt races in Great Britain
Ascot Racecourse
National Hunt hurdle races